Kesariya Balam is an Indian folk song from Rajasthan. It is one of the most popular Rajasthani folk music narrations. The song is sung in Mand singing style.

In popular culture
Earliest available recording of this song wrote by unknown and sung by singer Allah Jilai Bai. The song was also used in Hindi film, Lekin... (1991) set in Rajasthan, as Kesariya Baalma, in which it was sung by Lata Mangeshkar, set to music by Hridaynath Mangeshkar . It was used in Hindi film Dor. It was also used in the title of TV series, Kesariya Balam Aavo Hamare Des (2009).

References

Rajasthani music
Indian folk songs
Hindi film songs
Lata Mangeshkar songs
Year of song unknown